Jean Baeza (20 August 1942 – 21 February 2011) was a French professional footballer who played as a left-back.

References

External links
 
 
 Profile

1942 births
2011 deaths
French footballers
France international footballers
Association football defenders
AS Cannes players
AS Monaco FC players
Red Star F.C. players
Olympique Lyonnais players
Ligue 1 players
Ligue 2 players
Footballers from Algiers
21st-century Algerian people